Pha Lai Thermal Power Plant is the largest coal-fired power plant in Vietnam located in Pha Lai, Chí Linh District, Hải Dương Province, roughly  north-east of Hanoi. It has an installed electric capacity of 1,040 MW. Pha Lai 1 was fully financed and built with the Russian money and experts. 

Construction of the 440-MW first plant started on 17 May 1980 and it was completed in 1986. It consists of four 110-MW turbines and eight boilers. Construction of the 600-MW second plant started on 8 June 1998 and it was completed in 2001 by Lilama Construction Company.  It consist of two 300-MW units with Mitsui Babcock Energy designed natural circulation boilers and General Electric generators.

References

Coal-fired power stations in Vietnam
Energy infrastructure completed in 1986
Energy infrastructure completed in 2001
Buildings and structures in Hải Dương province